Maheshwari Public School (MPS) is a Co-Educational CBSE affiliated school located in Jawahar Nagar area in Jaipur city. It is governed by the Education Committee of The Maheshwari Samaj (society), Jaipur.  At present, Dr. Ashok Vaid is officiating principal of the school.

Over the years, MPS has become the most sought after school for the students to excel in academics. It hold a number of records each year for the academic excellence held by students in various competitive examinations. The new wing of the school accommodates an affluent auditorium along with an indoor sports arena.

History
Maheshwari Public School, initiated its journey in July 1977 and established as an independent institution in July 1978. Governed by the ECMS.

Facilities
The institution has  laboratories of Physics, Chemistry and Biology, Computer Labs with LAN connectivity, Audio Visual Aids Lab, an arena for Fine Arts, Music and Theatre, Indoor playrooms for Chess, Table Tennis, Carrom, etc. outdoor game courts for Volleyball and Basketball. The General School Library facilitates students with more than 20,000 titles along with CD-ROMs, various newspapers, multifarious magazines and competition alerts.

Achievements 
In the year 2019 the school was awarded as the number 1 school under all boys day school category in the state of Rajasthan for 7th consecutive year by Education World India School World. Also, it stood 15th in India under the same category.

References

External links 
 Maheshwari Public School

Schools in Jaipur
Boys' schools in India